Kaeo Pongprayoon (born 28 March 1980 in Kamphaeng Phet) is a Thai amateur boxer who won a silver medal at the 2012 Summer Olympics.

Pongprayoon won the 2009 Asian Amateur Boxing Championships and the 2009 Southeast Asian Games and 2011  at light flyweight.

At the 2009 World Amateur Boxing Championships he lost his third fight to José Kelvin de la Nieve.

At the 2011 World Amateur Boxing Championships he beat two opponents, then lost 8:14 to Zou Shiming.

At the 2012 Summer Olympics (results) he won his first fight against Algerian Mohamed Flissi 19:11, then defeated Ecuador's Carlos Quipo and Bulgarian Aleksandar Aleksandrov. He reached the final by edging out Russian David Ayrapetyan 13:12. He controversially lost the final to Zou Shiming 10:13.

External links
AIBA Bio

References 

1980 births
Living people
Boxers at the 2012 Summer Olympics
Kaeo Pongprayoon
Kaeo Pongprayoon
Olympic medalists in boxing
Kaeo Pongprayoon
Medalists at the 2012 Summer Olympics
Boxing trainers
Kaeo Pongprayoon
Kaeo Pongprayoon
Southeast Asian Games medalists in boxing
Kaeo Pongprayoon
Kaeo Pongprayoon
Competitors at the 2001 Southeast Asian Games
Competitors at the 2003 Southeast Asian Games
Competitors at the 2005 Southeast Asian Games
Competitors at the 2007 Southeast Asian Games
Competitors at the 2009 Southeast Asian Games
Competitors at the 2011 Southeast Asian Games
Light-flyweight boxers
Kaeo Pongprayoon